José Luis Garzón Fito (4 August 1946 – 17 March 2017) was a Spanish footballer. He competed in the men's tournament at the 1968 Summer Olympics.

References

External links
 

1946 births
2017 deaths
Spanish footballers
Olympic footballers of Spain
Footballers at the 1968 Summer Olympics
Footballers from Valencia (city)
Association football midfielders
CE Sabadell FC footballers
La Liga players
Segunda División players
Sporting de Gijón players
Sevilla FC players